Mona is an opera in three acts by composer Horatio Parker with an English libretto by Brian Hooker. The opera premiered at the Metropolitan Opera on 14 March 1912 after the work won the Met's composition competition in 1911.

Roles

Sources
usopera.com

Operas
1912 operas
English-language operas
Operas by Horatio Parker
Opera world premieres at the Metropolitan Opera
Operas set in the British Isles